Rookie is the fourth Korean extended play by South Korean girl group Red Velvet. It was released on February 1, 2017, by SM Entertainment. The album contains six tracks, including its lead single of the same name.

The mini-album was a commercial success, topping the Gaon Album Chart and Billboard's World Albums.

Background and release
On January 20, 2017, an SM Entertainment representative revealed that Red Velvet is planning on making a comeback in February. Four days later, the first batch of teasers were released through SM Entertainment's official website and their official Instagram account, with the release date shown on one of the photos.

The members briefly discussed their upcoming album which is revealed to be an extended play on the Naver app V Live.

The album was released in two formats physically — one being CD and another being Kihno kit. Each format has five different versions of album cover, each features a different member.

Composition
Billboard described the title track "Rookie" as a "pop-funk single that draws on Red Velvet's unconventional musicality to combine low-key sing-speaking and synth beats before blasting into the saccharine hook of a chorus". The song was composed by Jamil 'Digi' Chammas, Leven Kali, Sara Forsberg, Karl Powell, Harrison Johnson, Russell Steedle, MZMC, Otha 'Vakseen' Davis III and Tay Jasper with lyrics by Jo Yoon-kyung and was produced by The Colleagues.

"Little Little" is an R&B pop song written by Gifty Dankwah & Bruce Fielder and was penned by JQ, Jo Min-yang of Makeumine Works and Park Sung-hee of Jam Factory. "Happily Ever After" is a pop dance track composed by Sebastian Lundberg, Fredrik Haggstam, Johan Gustafsson, Courtney Woolsey and Deez with lyrics by Song Carrot of Jam Factory. "Talk to Me" is a mid-tempo song composed by Kervens Mazile,  Annalise Morelli, Alina Smith & Mats Ymell and was penned by Lee Seu-ran of Jam Factory. "Body Talk" is an R&B pop song written by Sebastian Lundberg, Fredrik Haggstam, Johan Gustafsson & Ylva.Dimberg with lyrics by Misfit & Jo Yoon-kyung. The last track "마지막 사랑 (Last Love)" is a solo by member Wendy with arrangement by Don Spike. It is a remake of a romantic ballad by Eco from their third album which was released in 1999.

Promotion
Hours before the music video and album's release, the group appeared on a live broadcast through the Naver app 'V Live' where they promoted and discussed the album. The group performed the song for the first time on KBS' Music Bank on February 3, 2017 and also appeared on Show! Music Core, Inkigayo and performed on The Show, Show Champion and M Countdown the following week. The group also appeared on the Arirang show After School Club on February 7.

Reception

Billboard called the title track "Rookie" a "quirky, funk-driven dance track with an unforgettable earworm of a hook". While The Star's Chester Chin thought that "Rookie" was the album's weakest track, he praised the rest of the album and noted that the group has finally found the perfect balance between their 'Red' and 'Velvet' sound, something he believed the group had been struggling with. He commented that it was the right mix of "saccharine and sophisticated" with its fun pop numbers and heartfelt ballads. According to The Korea Herald, Red Velvet's songs are known for being "weird at first, but addictive later" and "Rookie" is not an exception. Idolator chose it as the best k-pop song of the first quarter of the year. In 2017, Billboard put "Body Talk" at #10 on their '40 Best K-Pop Deep Cuts of the Decade So Far' list.

Rookie entered atop the Gaon Album Chart on the chart issue dated January 20 - February 4, 2017. The title track also charted at No. 4 on the Gaon Singles Chart and rose to No. 3 a week later. The other five tracks in the album also charted. The album topped Billboard's World Albums Chart and charted at No. 21 on its Heatseekers Album Chart. The group won their first music show trophy on The Show on February 7 and later won on Show Champion, M Countdown, Music Bank and Inkigayo for two consecutive weeks.

Track listing

Charts

Weekly charts

Monthly charts

Release history

References

Red Velvet (group) EPs
2017 EPs
SM Entertainment EPs
Korean-language EPs
Genie Music EPs
K-pop EPs